Bülent Arınç (born 25 May 1948) is a conservative Turkish politician. He served as the 22nd Speaker of the Parliament of Turkey from 2002 to 2007 and as a Deputy Prime Minister of Turkey between 2009 and 2015.

Early life and education
He was born on 25 May 1948 in Bursa, Turkey. After finishing high school in Manisa, Bülent Arınç attended University of Ankara, earning a Bachelor of Laws degree in 1970. After his graduation, he worked as a freelance lawyer in Manisa. He is of Grecophone Cretan Turk heritage with his ancestors arriving to Turkey as Cretan refugees during the time of Sultan Abdul Hamid II to escape massacres and is fluent in Cretan Greek.

Entry into politics
Interested in politics from his university years, Bülent Arınç ran for the deputy of Manisa in the 1995 general elections, and entered the Turkish Grand National Assembly from the Welfare Party. He became also a member of the board of his party, and served in the parliament's justice commission.

Following the closing of the Welfare Party by the Constitutional Court of Turkey on February 15, 1998, he transferred to the Virtue Party. Arınç was elected in the 1999 general elections as deputy of Manisa, this time from the Virtue Party. He became a member of the foreign affairs commission of the parliament.

The constitutional court closed the Virtue Party on June 22, 2001. Bülent Arınç, along with Recep Tayyip Erdoğan, co-founded the Justice and Development Party the same year on August 14. He was appointed speaker of his party's group in the parliament.

Bülent Arınç was elected the third time deputy of Manisa in the general elections held on November 3, 2002. On November 19, 2002, he was elected Speaker of the Parliament. On May 1, 2009, he was appointed as State Minister Responsible for Foundations and the Turkish Radio and Television Corporation (TRT; Turkish: Türkiye Radyo ve Televizyon Kurumu) and Deputy Prime Minister in the second cabinet of Erdoğan.

Views
Arınç refers to the Hagia Sophia as a mosque, which has angered the Greek government. He wishes to see it reconverted from a museum into a functioning mosque.

In 2014, Arınç stated women should not laugh out loud to him in public during a speech about "moral corruption" at an Eid al-Fitr holiday gathering: "She will not laugh in public to Mr. Arinc. She will not be inviting in her attitudes and will protect her chasteness." When asked to explain his comments, he suggested that women "leave their husbands at home, and go to vacation with their lovers" and that they "can't wait to climb poles when they see someone", referring to women who pole dance while on holiday. Both comments were widely ridiculed in social media.

In November 2020, Arınç resigned as a member of the High Advisory Board of the Turkish presidency, demanding political reforms in the.  He referred to the juridical situation in Turkey and advocated for the release of the philanthropist Osman Kavala and the Kurdish politician Selahattin Demirtaş of the Peoples Democratic Party. 

In 2012, he opposed education in the Kurdish language as he didn't deem it a "language of civilization".

Then in 2020 he encouraged the Turkish society to read the book Devran of Demirtaş, mentioning that the Kurds are the oppressed in Turkey. This drew a harsh criticism from Erdoğan, who denied there was a Kurdish issue in Turkey and branded Demirtaş as a terrorist.

Personal life
Bülent Arınç is married with two children. His third child, a son, was killed in a traffic accident in 1997. Arınç is of Cretan Turk heritage with his ancestors arriving to Turkey as Cretan refugees during the time of Sultan Abdülhamid II.

References

External links

  
 TBMM profile 
 https://twitter.com/bulent_arinc

|-

1948 births
Ankara University Faculty of Law alumni
Cretan Turks
Deputies of Bursa
Deputies of Manisa
Deputy Prime Ministers of Turkey
Justice and Development Party (Turkey) politicians
Living people
Speakers of the Parliament of Turkey
Virtue Party politicians
Welfare Party politicians
Members of the 24th Parliament of Turkey
Members of the 23rd Parliament of Turkey
Members of the 22nd Parliament of Turkey
Members of the 21st Parliament of Turkey
Members of the 20th Parliament of Turkey
Ministers of State of Turkey
Members of the 60th government of Turkey